The Liévano–Brutus treaty is a treaty that defined the maritime boundary between the Republic of Colombia and Haiti. The treaty was signed in the town of Port-au-Prince on February 17, 1978. The treaty was approved by the Congress of Colombia by Law 12 of 1978. Ratification of the treaty was officially done on February 16, 1979. The treaty also stipulates that there must be cooperation on environmental issues and the protection of migratory species.

The full name of the treaty is Agreement on Delimitation of the Maritime Boundaries between the Republic of Colombia and the Republic of Haiti. It is named for the foreign ministers of the two countries that signed the agreement—Indalecio Liévano of Colombia and Edner Brutus of Haiti.

See also

Foreign relations of Colombia
Foreign relations of Haiti

References

External links
Full text of treaty

Treaties of Colombia
Treaties of Haiti
Boundary treaties
Borders of Colombia
Borders of Haiti
1978 in Haiti
1978 in Colombia
Treaties concluded in 1978
Treaties entered into force in 1979